Yongquan Temple, may refer to:

 Yongquan Temple (Fuzhou), in Fuzhou, Fujian, China
 Yongquan Temple (Zhouzhi County), in Zhouzhi County, Shaanxi, China

Buddhist temple disambiguation pages